East Prussia was a province of the Kingdom of Prussia from 1773 to 1829 and again from 1878 (with the Kingdom itself being part of the German Empire from 1871); following World War I it formed part of the Weimar Republic's Free State of Prussia, until 1945. Its capital city was Königsberg (present-day Kaliningrad). East Prussia was the main part of the region of Prussia along the southeastern Baltic Coast.

The bulk of the ancestral lands of the Baltic Old Prussians were enclosed within East Prussia. During the 13th century, the native Prussians were conquered by the crusading Teutonic Knights. After the conquest the indigenous Balts were gradually converted to Christianity. Because of Germanization and colonisation over the following centuries, Germans became the dominant ethnic group, while Masurians and Lithuanians formed minorities. From the 13th century, East Prussia was part of the monastic state of the Teutonic Knights. After the Second Peace of Thorn in 1466 it became a fief of the Kingdom of Poland. In 1525, with the Prussian Homage, the province became the Duchy of Prussia. The Old Prussian language had become extinct by the 17th or early 18th century.

Because the duchy was outside of the core Holy Roman Empire, the prince-electors of Brandenburg were able to proclaim themselves King beginning in 1701. After the annexation of most of western Royal Prussia in the First Partition of the Polish–Lithuanian Commonwealth in 1772, eastern (ducal) Prussia was connected by land with the rest of the Prussian state and was reorganized as a province the following year (1773). Between 1829 and 1878, the Province of East Prussia was joined with West Prussia to form the Province of Prussia.

The Kingdom of Prussia became the leading state of the German Empire after its creation in 1871. However, the Treaty of Versailles following World War I granted West Prussia to Poland and made East Prussia an exclave of Weimar Germany (the new Polish Corridor separated East Prussia from the rest of Germany), while the Memel Territory was detached and annexed by Lithuania in 1923. Following Nazi Germany's defeat in World War II in 1945, war-torn East Prussia was divided at Joseph Stalin's insistence between the Soviet Union (the Kaliningrad Oblast became part of the Russian SFSR, and the constituent counties of the Klaipėda Region in the Lithuanian SSR) and the People's Republic of Poland (the Warmian-Masurian Voivodeship). The capital city Königsberg was renamed Kaliningrad in 1946. The German population of the province was largely evacuated during the war or expelled shortly afterwards in the expulsion of Germans after World War II.

Background 

At the instigation of Duke Konrad I of Masovia, the Teutonic Knights took possession of Prussia in the 13th century and created a monastic state to administer the conquered Old Prussians. Local Old-Prussian (north) and Polish (south) toponyms were gradually Germanised. The Knights' expansionist policies, including occupation of Polish Pomerania with Gdańsk/Danzig and western Lithuania, brought them into conflict with the Kingdom of Poland and embroiled them in several wars, culminating in the Polish-Lithuanian-Teutonic War, whereby the united armies of Poland and Lithuania, defeated the Teutonic Order at the Battle of Grunwald (Tannenberg) in 1410. Its defeat was formalised in the Second Treaty of Thorn in 1466 ending the Thirteen Years' War, and leaving the former Polish region Pomerania/Pomerelia under Polish control. Together with Warmia it formed the province of Royal Prussia. Eastern Prussia remained under the Knights but as a fief of Poland. 1466 and 1525 arrangements by kings of Poland were not verified by the Holy Roman Empire, as well as the previous gains of the Teutonic Knights, were not verified.

The Teutonic Order lost eastern Prussia when Grand Master Albert of Brandenburg-Ansbach converted to Lutheranism and secularized the Prussian branch of the Teutonic Order in 1525. Albert established himself as the first duke of the Duchy of Prussia and a vassal of the Polish crown by the Prussian Homage. Walter von Cronberg, the next Grand Master, was enfeoffed with the title to Prussia after the Diet of Augsburg in 1530, but the Order never regained possession of the territory. In 1569 the Hohenzollern prince-electors of the Margraviate of Brandenburg became co-regents with Albert's son, the feeble-minded Albert Frederick.

The Administrator of Prussia, the grandmaster of the Teutonic Order Maximilian III, son of emperor Maximilian II died in 1618. When Maximilian died, Albert's line died out, and the Duchy of Prussia passed to the Electors of Brandenburg, forming Brandenburg-Prussia. Taking advantage of the Swedish invasion of Poland in 1655, and instead of fulfilling his vassal's duties towards the Polish Kingdom, by joining forces with the Swedes and subsequent treaties of Wehlau, Labiau, and Oliva, Elector and Duke Frederick William succeeded in revoking the king of Poland's sovereignty over the Duchy of Prussia in 1660. The absolutist elector also subdued the noble estates of Prussia.

History as a province

Kingdom of Prussia 
Although Brandenburg was a part of the Holy Roman Empire, the Prussian lands were not within the Holy Roman Empire and were with the administration by the Teutonic Order grandmasters under jurisdiction of the Emperor. In return for supporting Emperor Leopold I in the War of the Spanish Succession, Elector Frederick III was allowed to crown himself "King in Prussia" in 1701. The new kingdom ruled by the Hohenzollern dynasty became known as the Kingdom of Prussia. The designation "Kingdom of Prussia" was gradually applied to the various lands of Brandenburg-Prussia. To differentiate it from the larger entity, the former Duchy of Prussia became known as Altpreußen ("Old Prussia"), the province of Prussia, or "East Prussia".

Approximately one-third of East Prussia's population died in the Great Northern War plague outbreak and famine of 1709–1711, including the last speakers of Old Prussian. The plague, probably brought by foreign troops during the Great Northern War, killed 250,000 East Prussians, especially in the province's eastern regions. Crown Prince Frederick William I led the rebuilding of East Prussia, founding numerous towns. Thousands of Protestants expelled from the Archbishopric of Salzburg were allowed to settle in depleted East Prussia. The province was overrun by Imperial Russian troops during the Seven Years' War.

In the 1772 First Partition of Poland, the Prussian king Frederick the Great annexed neighboring Royal Prussia, i.e., the Polish voivodeships of Pomerania (Gdańsk Pomerania or Pomerelia), Malbork, Chełmno and the Prince-Bishopric of Warmia, thereby connecting his Prussian and Farther Pomeranian lands and cutting the rest of Poland from the Baltic coast. The territory of Warmia was incorporated into the lands of former Ducal Prussia, which, by administrative deed of 31 January 1772 were named East Prussia. The former Polish Pomerelian lands beyond the Vistula River together with Malbork and Chełmno Land formed the Province of West Prussia with its capital at Marienwerder (Kwidzyn) in 1773. The Polish Partition Sejm ratified the cession on 30 September 1772, whereafter Frederick officially went on to call himself a King "of" Prussia.

The former Ducal Prussian districts of Eylau (Iława), Marienwerder, Riesenburg (Prabuty) and Schönberg (Szymbark) passed to West Prussia. Until the Prussian reforms of 1808, the administration in East Prussia was transferred to the General War and Finance Directorate in Berlin, represented by two local chamber departments:
 German chamber department at Königsberg with the districts of:
 Brandenburg
 Neidenburg
 Rastenburg
 Samland
 Tapiau
 Braunsberg (Ermland)
 Heilsberg (Ermland)
 Mohrungen (Ermland)
 Lithuanian chamber department at Gumbinnen (Gusev) with the districts of:
 Gumbinnen
 Insterburg
 Memel
 Olecko
 Ragnit
 Seehesten (Sensburg)
 Tilsit

On 31 January 1773, King Frederick II announced that the newly annexed lands were to be known as the Province of West Prussia, while the former Duchy of Prussia and the Prince-Bishopric of Warmia became the Province of East Prussia.

Napoleonic Wars

After the disastrous defeat of the Royal Prussian Army at the Battle of Jena-Auerstedt in 1806, Napoleon occupied Berlin and had the officials of the Prussian General Directorate swear an oath of allegiance to him, while King Frederick William III and his consort Louise fled via Königsberg and the Curonian Spit to Memel. The French Grande Armée troops immediately took up pursuit but were delayed in the Battle of Eylau on 9 February 1807 by an East Prussian contingent under General Anton Wilhelm von L'Estocq. Napoleon had to stay at the Finckenstein Palace, but in May, after a siege of 75 days, his troops led by Marshal François Joseph Lefebvre were able to capture the city of Danzig, which had been tenaciously defended by General Count Friedrich Adolf von Kalkreuth. On 14 June, Napoleon ended the War of the Fourth Coalition with his victory at the Battle of Friedland. Frederick William and Queen Louise met with Napoleon for peace negotiations, and on 9 July the Prussian king signed the Treaty of Tilsit.

The succeeding Prussian reforms instigated by Heinrich Friedrich Karl vom und zum Stein and Karl August von Hardenberg included the implementation of an Oberlandesgericht appellation court at Königsberg, a municipal corporation, economic freedom as well as emancipation of the serfs and Jews. In the course of the Prussian restoration by the 1815 Congress of Vienna, the East Prussian territories were re-arranged in the Regierungsbezirke of Gumbinnen and Königsberg. From 1905, the southern districts of East Prussia formed the separate Regierungsbezirk of Allenstein. East and West Prussia were first united in personal union in 1824 and then merged in a real union in 1829 to form the Province of Prussia. The united province was again split into separate East and West Prussian provinces in 1878.

German Empire 
From 1824 to 1878, East Prussia was combined with West Prussia to form the Province of Prussia, after which they were reestablished as separate provinces. Along with the rest of the Kingdom of Prussia, East Prussia became part of the German Empire during the unification of Germany in 1871.

From 1885 to 1890 Berlin's population grew by 20%, Brandenburg and the Rhineland gained 8.5%, Westphalia 10%, while East Prussia lost 0.07% and West Prussia 0.86%. This stagnancy in population despite a high birth surplus in eastern Germany was because many people from the East Prussian countryside moved westward to seek work in the expanding industrial centres of the Ruhr Area and Berlin (see Ostflucht).

The population of the province in 1900 was 1,996,626 people, with a religious makeup of 1,698,465 Protestants, 269,196 Roman Catholics, and 13,877 Jews. The Low Prussian dialect predominated in East Prussia, although High Prussian was spoken in Warmia. The numbers of Masurians, Kursenieki and Prussian Lithuanians decreased over time due to the process of Germanization. The Polish-speaking population concentrated in the south of the province (Masuria and Warmia) and all German geographic atlases at the start of 20th century showed the southern part of East Prussia as Polish with the number of Polish-speakers estimated at the time to be 300,000. Kursenieki inhabited the areas around the Curonian lagoon, while Lithuanian-speaking Prussians concentrated in the northeast in (Lithuania Minor). The Old Prussian ethnic group became completely Germanized over time and the Old Prussian language died out in the 18th century.

World War I 
At the German entry into World War I, East Prussia became a theatre of war when the Russian Empire invaded the country. The Imperial Russian Army encountered at first little resistance because the bulk of the Imperial German Army had been directed towards the Western Front according to the Schlieffen Plan. Despite early success and the capture of the towns of Rastenburg and Gumbinnen, in the Battle of Tannenberg in 1914 and the Second Battle of the Masurian Lakes in 1915, the Russians were decisively defeated and forced to retreat. The Russians were followed by the German Army advancing into Russian territory.

After the Russian army's first invasion the majority of the civilian population fled westwards, while several thousand remaining civilians were deported to Russia. Treatment of civilians by both armies was mostly disciplined, although 74 civilians were killed by Russian troops in the Abschwangen massacre. The region had to be rebuilt because of damage caused by the war.

Division after 1918

Weimar Republic 

With the forced abdication of Emperor Wilhelm II in the German Revolution of 1918–1919, Germany became a republic. Most of the former Prussian provinces of West Prussia and Posen, territories annexed by Prussia in the 18th century Partitions of Poland, were ceded to the Second Polish Republic according to the Treaty of Versailles. East Prussia became an exclave, being separated from mainland Germany. The Memelland was also separated from the province. Because most of West Prussia became part of the Second Polish Republic as the Polish Corridor, the formerly West Prussian Marienwerder region became part of East Prussia as the administrative district (Regierungsbezirk) of West Prussia. Also, the Soldau district in the Allenstein region became part of the Second Polish Republic. The Seedienst Ostpreußen (Sea Service East Prussia) was established to provide an independent transport service to East Prussia.

On 11 July 1920, amidst the backdrop of the Polish-Soviet War in which the Second Polish Republic appeared to be on the brink of defeat, the East Prussian plebiscite in eastern West Prussia and southern East Prussia was held under Allied supervision to determine if the areas should join Poland or remain in the Weimar Germany Province of East Prussia. 96.7% of the people voted to remain within Germany (97.89% in the East Prussian plebiscite district).

The Klaipėda Territory (Memelland), a League of Nations mandate since 1920, was occupied by the Lithuanian Armed Forces in 1923 and annexed without giving the inhabitants a choice by ballot.

Nazi Germany 

After Adolf Hitler's rise to power, opposition politicians were persecuted and newspapers banned. Erich Koch, who headed the East Prussian Nazi party from 1928, led the district from 1932. The Otto-Braun-House was requisitioned to become the headquarters of the SA, which used the house to imprison and torture its opponents. Walter Schütz, a communist member of the Reichstag, was murdered here. This period was characterized by efforts to collectivize the local agriculture and ruthlessness in dealing with his [whose? Koch's?] critics inside and outside the Nazi Party. He also had long-term plans for mass-scale industrialization of the largely agricultural province. These actions made him unpopular among the local peasants. In 1932 the local paramilitary SA had already started to terrorise their political opponents. On the night of 31 July 1932 there was a bomb attack on the headquarters of the Social Democrats in Königsberg, the Otto-Braun-House. The Communist politician Gustav Sauf was killed; the executive editor of the Social Democratic newspaper "Königsberger Volkszeitung", Otto Wyrgatsch; and the German People's Party politician Max von Bahrfeldt were all severely injured. Members of the Reichsbanner were assaulted while the local Reichsbanner Chairman of Lötzen, Kurt Kotzan, was murdered on 6 August 1932.

In the March 1933 German federal election, the last pre-war German elections, the local population of East Prussia voted overwhelmingly for the Adolf Hitler's Nazi Party.

Through publicly funded emergency relief programs concentrating on agricultural land-improvement projects and road construction, the "Erich Koch Plan" for East Prussia allegedly made the province free of unemployment: on 16 August 1933 Koch reported to Hitler that unemployment had been banished entirely from the province, a feat that gained admiration throughout the Reich. In actuality, the Erich Koch Plan had been a staged propaganda event organized by Walther Funk and the Reich Ministry of Public Enlightenment and Propaganda to promote the Nazi Party's work creation policies, with East Prussia chosen because it already had relatively low unemployment due to its agrarian economy. Koch's industrialization plans provoked conflict with Richard Walther Darré, who held the office of the Reich Peasant Leader (Reichsbauernführer) and Minister of Agriculture. Darré, a neopaganist rural romantic, wanted to enforce his vision of an agricultural East Prussia.  When his "Land" representatives challenged Koch's plans, Koch arrested them.

In 1938 the Nazis altered about one-third of the toponyms of the area, eliminating, Germanizing, or simplifying a number of Old Prussian, as well as those Polish or Lithuanian names originating from colonists and refugees to Prussia during and after the Protestant Reformation. More than 1,500 places were ordered to be renamed by 16 July 1938 following a decree issued by Gauleiter and Oberpräsident Erich Koch and initiated by Adolf Hitler. Many who would not cooperate with the rulers of Nazi Germany were sent to concentration camps and held prisoner there until their death or liberation.

After the 1939 German ultimatum to Lithuania, the Klaipėda region was integrated again into East Prussia.

World War II 

After the 1939 invasion of Poland by Nazi Germany opening World War II, the borders of East Prussia were revised. Regierungsbezirk Westpreußen became part of Reichsgau Danzig-West Prussia, while Regierungsbezirk Zichenau was added to East Prussia. Originally part of the Zichenau region, the Sudauen district in Sudovia was later transferred to the Gumbinnen region.
In 1939 East Prussia had 2.49 million inhabitants, 85% of them ethnic Germans, the others Poles in the south who, according to Polish estimates numbered in the interwar period around 300,000-350,000, the Latvian speaking Kursenieki, and Lietuvininkai who spoke Lithuanian in the northeast. Most German East Prussians, Masurians, Kursieniki, and Lietuvininkai were Lutheran, while the population of Ermland was mainly Roman Catholic due to the history of its bishopric. The East Prussian Jewish Congregation declined from about 9,000 in 1933 to 3,000 in 1939, as most fled from Nazi rule.

During World War II, the Polish ethnic minorities of Catholic Warmians and Lutheran Masurians were persecuted by the Nazi German government, which wanted to erase all aspects of Polish culture and Polish language in Warmia and Masuria The Jews who remained in East Prussia in 1942 were shipped to concentration camps, including Theresienstadt in occupied Czechoslovakia, Kaiserwald in occupied Latvia, and camps in Minsk in occupied Byelorussian Soviet Socialist Republic. Those who remained were later deported and killed in the Holocaust.

In 1939 the Regierungsbezirk Zichenau was annexed by Germany and incorporated into East Prussia. Parts of it were transferred to other regions, e.g. Suwałki Region to Regierungsbezirk Gumbinnen and Soldau to Regierungsbezirk Allenstein. Despite Nazi propaganda presenting all of the regions annexed as possessing significant German populations that wanted reunification with Germany, the Reich's statistics of late 1939 show that only 31,000 out of 994,092 people in this territory were ethnic Germans.

Hitler's top-secret Eastern front headquarters during the war, the Wolf's Lair, was located in East Prussia, near the town of Rasternburg.

East Prussia was only slightly affected by the war until January 1945, when it was devastated during the East Prussian Offensive. Most of its inhabitants became refugees in bitterly cold weather during the Evacuation of East Prussia.

Evacuation of East Prussia 

In 1944 the medieval city of Königsberg, which had never been severely damaged by warfare in its 700 years of existence, was almost completely destroyed by two RAF Bomber Command raids – the first on the night of 26/27 August 1944, with the second one three nights later, overnight on 29/30 August 1944. Winston Churchill (The Second World War, Book XII) had erroneously believed it to be "a modernized heavily defended fortress" and ordered its destruction.

Gauleiter Erich Koch delayed the evacuation of the German civilian population until the Eastern Front approached the East Prussian border in 1944. The population had been systematically misinformed by Endsieg Nazi propaganda about the real state of military affairs. As a result, many civilians fleeing westward were overtaken by retreating Wehrmacht units and the rapidly advancing Red Army.

Reports of Soviet atrocities in the Nemmersdorf massacre of October 1944 and organized rape spread fear and desperation among the civilians. Thousands lost their lives during the sinkings (by Soviet submarine) of the evacuation ships Wilhelm Gustloff, the Goya, and the General von Steuben. Königsberg surrendered on 9 April 1945, following the desperate four-day Battle of Königsberg. An estimated 300,000 died either in war time bombing raids, in the battles to defend the province, or through mistreatment by the Red Army or from hunger, cold and disease.

However, most of the German inhabitants, which then consisted primarily of women, children and old men, did manage to escape the Red Army as part of the largest exodus of people in human history: "A population which had stood at 2.2 million in 1940 was reduced to 193,000 at the end of May 1945."

History after partition and annexation

Following Nazi Germany's defeat in World War II in 1945, East Prussia was partitioned between Poland and the Soviet Union according to the Potsdam Conference, pending a final peace conference with Germany. Since a peace conference never took place, the region was effectively ceded by Germany. Southern East Prussia was placed under Polish administration, while northern East Prussia was divided between the Soviet republics of Russia (the Kaliningrad Oblast) and Lithuania (the constituent counties of the Klaipėda Region). The city of Königsberg was renamed Kaliningrad in 1946. Most of the German population of the province had left during the evacuation at the end of the war, but several hundreds of thousands died during the years 1944–46 and the remainder were subsequently expelled.

Expulsion of Germans from East Prussia after World War II

Shortly after the end of the war in May 1945, Germans who had fled in early 1945 tried to return to their homes in East Prussia. An estimated number of 800,000 Germans were living in East Prussia during the summer of 1945. Many more were prevented from returning, and the German population of East Prussia was almost completely expelled by the communist regimes. During the war and for some time thereafter 45 camps were established for about 200,000-250,000 forced labourers, the vast majority of whom were deported to the Soviet Union, including the Gulag camp system. The largest camp with about 48,000 inmates was established at Deutsch Eylau (Iława). Orphaned children who were left behind in the zone occupied by the Soviet Union were referred to as Wolf children.

Southern East Prussia to Poland

Representatives of the Polish government officially took over the civilian administration of the southern part of East Prussia on 23 May 1945. Subsequently, Polish expatriates from Polish lands annexed by the Soviet Union as well as Ukrainians and Lemkos from southern Poland, expelled in Operation Vistula, were settled in the area, initially organised as the Masurian District, later replaced by the Olsztyn Voivodeship in 1947, with a few counties incorporated into Białystok Voivodeship and to Gdańsk Voivodeship. The latter counted in 1950 689,000 inhabitants, 22.6% of them coming from areas annexed by the Soviet Union, 10% Ukrainians, and 18.5% of them pre-war inhabitants. It was dissolved in 1975 to form three smaller units: a much smaller homonymous Olsztyn Voivodeship, the bulk of Elbląg Voivodeship and a significant part of the Suwałki Voivodeship.

The remaining pre-war population was treated as Germanized Poles and a policy of re-Polonization was pursued throughout the country Most of these "Autochthons" chose to emigrate to West Germany from the 1950s through 1980s (between 1970 and 1988 55,227 persons from Warmia and Masuria moved to Western Germany). Local toponyms were Polonised by the Polish Commission for the Determination of Place Names.

Origin of the post-war population 
During the Polish post-war census of December 1950, data about the pre-war places of residence of the inhabitants as of August 1939 was collected. In case of children born between September 1939 and December 1950, their origin was reported based on the pre-war places of residence of their mothers. Thanks to this data it is possible to reconstruct the pre-war geographical origin of the post-war population. The same area corresponding to pre-war southern parts of East Prussia (which became Polish in 1945) was inhabited in December 1950 by:

Over 80% of the 1950 inhabitants were new in the region, less than 20% had resided in the province already back in 1939 (so called autochthons, who had German citizenship before World War II and were granted Polish citizenship after 1945). Over 20% of all inhabitants were Poles expelled from areas of Eastern Poland annexed by the USSR. The rest were mostly people from neighbouring areas located right next to East Prussia (almost 44% came from Masovia, Sudovia, Podlachia and pre-war Polish Pomerania) and southern Poland (≈16%).

Northern part to the Soviet Union

In April 1946, northern East Prussia became an official province of the Russian Soviet Federative Socialist Republic as the "Kyonigsbergskaya Oblast", with the Memel Territory becoming part of the Lithuanian Soviet Socialist Republic. In June 1946 114,070 German and 41,029 Soviet citizens were registered in the Oblast, with an unknown number of disregarded unregistered persons. In July of that year, the historic city of Königsberg was renamed Kaliningrad to honour Mikhail Kalinin and the area named the Kaliningrad Oblast. Between 24 August and 26 October 1948 21 transports with in total 42,094 Germans left the Oblast to the Soviet Occupation Zone (which became East Germany). The last remaining Germans left in November 1949 (1,401 persons) and January 1950 (7 persons).

The Prussian Lithuanians also experienced the same fate.

A similar fate befell the Curonians who lived in the area around the Curonian Lagoon. While many fled from the Red Army during the evacuation of East Prussia, Curonians that remained behind were subsequently expelled by the Soviet Union. Only 219 lived along the Curonian Spit in 1955. Many had German names such as Fritz or Hans, a cause for anti-German discrimination. The Soviet authorities considered the Curonians fascists. Because of this discrimination, many immigrated to West Germany in 1958, where the majority of Curonians now live.

After the expulsion of the German population ethnic Russians, Belarusians, and Ukrainians were settled in the northern part. In the Soviet part of the region, a policy of eliminating all remnants of German history was pursued. All German place names were replaced by new Russian names. The exclave was a military zone, which was closed to foreigners; Soviet citizens could only enter with special permission. In 1967 the remnants of Königsberg Castle were demolished on the orders of Leonid Brezhnev to make way for a new "House of the Soviets".

Modern status

Although the 1945–1949 expulsion of Germans from the northern part of former East Prussia was often conducted in a violent and aggressive way by Soviet officials, the present Russian inhabitants of the Kaliningrad Oblast have much less animosity towards Germans. German names have been revived in commercial Russian trade and there is sometimes talk of reverting Kaliningrad's name to its historic name of Königsberg. The city centre of Kaliningrad was completely rebuilt, as Royal Air Force bombs in 1944 and the Soviet siege in 1945 had left it in ruins.

Since the dissolution of the Soviet Union in 1991, some German groups have tried to help settle the Volga Germans from eastern parts of European Russia in the Kaliningrad Oblast. This effort was only a small success, however, as most impoverished Volga Germans preferred to emigrate to the richer Federal Republic of Germany, where they could become German citizens through the right of return.

The Polish part of the region region, divided in 1975 to form three units: the Olsztyn Voivodeship, the Elbląg Voivodeship and the Suwałki Voivodeship, has been reestablished as a single entity in 1999 under the name of Warmian-Masurian Voivodeship, whose borders correspond closely to those of southern East Prussia. Since 2004, Poland and Lithuania have become European Union member states, and both the Polish part of the region as well as  the Lithuanian Klaipeda Region, have thereafter become freely accessible by Germans, in line with the free movement of people policy.

Demographics

Historical ethnic and religious structure 
In year 1824, shortly before its merger with West Prussia, the population of East Prussia was 1,080,000 people. Of that number, according to Karl Andree, ethnic Germans were slightly more than half, while 280,000 (≈26%) were ethnically Polish and 200,000 (≈19%) were ethnically Lithuanian. As of year 1819, there were also 20,000 strong ethnic Curonian and Latvian minorities as well as 2,400 Jews, according to Georg Hassel. Similar numbers are given by August von Haxthausen in his 1839 book, with a breakdown by county. However, the majority of East Prussian Polish and Lithuanian inhabitants were Lutherans, not Roman Catholics like their ethnic kinsmen across the border in the Russian Empire. Only in Southern Warmia (German: Ermland) Catholic Poles - so called Warmiaks (not to be confused with predominantly Protestant Masurians) - comprised the majority of population, numbering 26,067 people (≈81%) in county Allenstein (Polish: Olsztyn) in 1837. Another minority in 19th century East Prussia, were ethnically Russian Old Believers, also known as Philipponnen - their main town was Eckersdorf (Wojnowo).

In year 1817, East Prussia had 796,204 Evangelical Christians, 120,123 Roman Catholics, 864 Mennonites and 2,389 Jews.

Ethnolinguistic composition by district 

As of 1905, the province of East Prussia was divided into three government regions, known as Regierungsbezirke. These were the regions of Königsberg, Gumbinnen and Allenstein.

Administration
The Prussian central government appointed for every province an Oberpräsident ("Upper President") carrying out central prerogatives on the provincial level and supervising the implementation of central policy on the lower levels of administration.

Since 1875, with the strengthening of self-rule, the urban and rural districts (Kreise) within each province (sometimes within each governorate) formed a corporation with common tasks and assets (schools, traffic installations, hospitals, cultural institutions, jails etc.) called the Provinzialverband (provincial association). Initially the assemblies of the urban and rural districts elected representatives for the provincial diets (Provinziallandtage), which were thus indirectly elected. As of 1919 the provincial diets (or as to governorate diets, the so-called Kommunallandtage) were directly elected by the citizens of the provinces (or governorates, respectively). These parliaments legislated within the competences transferred to the provincial associations. The provincial diet of East Prussia elected a provincial executive body (government), the provincial committee (Provinzialausschuss), and a head of province, the Landeshauptmann ("Land Captain"; till the 1880s titled Landdirektor, land director).

Upper Presidents of East Prussia and Prussia
 1765–1791: Johann Friedrich von Domhardt, president of the Gumbinnen and Königsberg War and Demesnes Chambers
 1791–1808: Friedrich Leopold von Schrötter, president of the Gumbinnen and Königsberg War and Demesnes Chambers, as of 1795 Minister for East and New East Prussia 
 1808–1814: vacancy?
 1814–1824: Hans Jakob von Auerswald, upper president of East Prussia 
 1824–1842: Heinrich Theodor von Schön, upper president of Prussia, merged from East and West Prussia, since 1816 already upper president of West Prussia  
 1842–1848: Carl Wilhelm von Bötticher, upper president of Prussia
 1848–1849: Rudolf von Auerswald, upper president of Prussia
 1849–1850: Eduard Heinrich von Flottwell (1786–1865), upper president of Prussia
 1850–1868: Franz August Eichmann, upper president of Prussia
 1868–1869: vacancy
 1869–1882: Carl Wilhelm Heinrich Georg von Horn, upper president of Prussia, after 1878 of East Prussia
 1882–1891: Albrecht Heinrich von Schlieckmann, upper president of East Prussia
 1891–1895: Count Udo zu Stolberg-Wernigerode, upper president of East Prussia
 1895–1901: Count Wilhelm von Bismarck-Schönhausen, upper president of East Prussia
 1901–1903: Hugo Samuel von Richthofen, upper president of East Prussia
 1903–1907: Count Friedrich von Moltke, upper president of East Prussia
 1907–1914: Ludwig von Windheim, upper president of East Prussia
 1914–1916: Adolf Tortilowicz von Batocki-Friebe, upper president of East Prussia
 1916–1918: Friedrich von Berg, upper president of East Prussia
 1918–1919: Adolf Tortilowicz von Batocki-Friebe, upper president of East Prussia
 1919–1920: August Winnig (SPD), upper president of East Prussia
 1920–1932: Ernst Siehr (DDP), upper president of East Prussia
 1932–1933: Wilhelm Kutscher (DNVP), upper president of East Prussia
 1933–1945: Erich Koch (NSDAP), upper president of East Prussia

Elections to the provincial diets

|-style="background:#E9E9E9;"
!colspan="2" align="left"|Parties
!%1921
!+/-1921
!Seats1921
!+/-1921
!%1925
!+/-1925
!Seats1925
!+/-1925
!%1929
!+/-1929
!Seats1929
!+/-1929
!%1933
!+/-1933
!Seats1933
!+/-1933
|-
|bgcolor="red"|
|align="left"|SPD
|24.1
|
|20
|
|rowspan="1"|24.8 
|rowspan="2"| +0.7 (-) 
|rowspan="2"|22
|rowspan="2"| +2 (-4)
|rowspan="2"|26 
|rowspan="2"| +1.2
|rowspan="2"|23
|rowspan="2"| +1
|rowspan="2"|13.6 
|rowspan="2"| -12.4
|rowspan="2"|12
|rowspan="2"| -11
|-
|bgcolor="#ff2222"|
|align="left"|USPD
|
|
|6
| +6
| mergedin SPD
|-
|bgcolor="#63B8ff"|
|align="left"|DNVP
|13.4
| +13.4
|11
| +11
|rowspan="2"|45.6
|rowspan="2"| 
|rowspan="2"|40
|rowspan="2"| (+4)
|31.2 
| (+17.8)
|27
| (+16)
|12.7 
| -18.5
|11
| -16
|-
|bgcolor="blue"|
|align="left"|DVP
|3.6
| +3.6
|4
| +4
|8.7
| (+5.1)
|8
| (+4)
|
|
|0
| -8
|-
|bgcolor="turquoise"|
|align="left"|BWA
|
|
|16
| +16
|
|
|0
| -16
| 
|
|0
| 0
| 
|
|0
| 0
|-
|bgcolor="#0000CD"|
|align="left"|Zentrum
|9.3
|
|8
| +8
|6.9
| -2.4
|6
| -2
|8.1
| +1.2
|7 
| +1
|7 
| -1.1
|7
| 0
|-
|bgcolor="#8B0000"|
|align="left"|KPD
|7
| +7
|6
| +6
|6.9 
| -0.1
|6 
| 0
| 8.6
| +1.7
| 8
| +2
| 6
| -2.6
| 6
| -2
|-
|bgcolor="black"|
|align="left"|BWW
|
|
|6
| +6
|
|
|0
| -6
| 
|
|0
| 0
| 
|
|0
| 0
|-
!colspan="2" align="left"|Parties
!%1921
!+/-1921
!Seats1921
!+/-1921
!%1925
!+/-1925
!Seats1925
!+/-1925
!%1929
!+/-1929
!Seats1929
!+/-1929
!%1933
!+/-1933
!Seats1933
!+/-1933
|-
|bgcolor="yellow"|
|align="left"|DDP
|5.7
| +5.7
|6
| +6
|3.6
| -2.1
|3
| -3
|2.8 
| -0.8
|3
| 0
|
|
|0
| -3
|-
|bgcolor="brown"|
|align="left"|NSDAP
|not run
|not run
|not run
|not run
|
| 
|
| 
|4.3 
| 
|4
| +4
|58.2
| +53,9
|51
| +47
|-
|bgcolor="#CEB673"|
|align="left"|LL/WP
|
|
|2
| +2
|4.2 
| +4.2
|4
| +2
|4 
| -1.2
|4
| 0
|
|
|0
| -4
|-
|bgcolor="#645D25"|
|align="left"|DFP
|not run
|not run
|not run
|not run
|4.2
| +4.2
|4
| +4
|
|
|0
| -4
|
|
|0
| 0
|-
|bgcolor="purple"|
|align="left"|CSVD
|not run
|not run
|not run
|not run
|not run
|not run
|not run
|not run
|3
| +3
|3
| +3
|
|
|0
| -3
|-
|bgcolor="#ffDEAD"|
|align="left"|AuA
|not run
|not run
|not run
|not run
|
|
|2
| +2
|
|
|0
| -2
|
|
|0
| 0
|-
|bgcolor="green"|
|align="left"|FOW
|
|
|2
| +2
|
| 
|0
| -2
|
|
|0
| 0
|
|
|0
| 0
|-
|bgcolor="#553A26"|
|align="left"|Poles' Party
|
|
|1
| +1
|
|
|0
| -1
| 
|
|0
| 0
| 
|
|0
| 0
|-
|bgcolor="#eeeeee"|
|align="left"|Others
|
|
|2
| +?
|
|
|0
| -2
|
|
|0
| 0
|
|
|0
| 0
|-style="background:#E9E9E9;"
!colspan="2" align="left"|Total1921
!align="center" colspan="2"|
!align="center" colspan="1"|85
!
!colspan="2" align="left"|Total1925
!align="center" colspan="1"|87
!
!colspan="2" align="left"|Total1929
!align="center" colspan="1"|87
!
!colspan="2" align="left"|Total1933
!align="center" colspan="1"|87
!
|}

Land Directors and Land Captains of East Prussia
 1876–1878: Heinrich Edwin Rickert (NLP, later DFP), titled land director
 1878–1884: Kurt von Saucken-Tarputschen (Fortschritt, later DFP), titled land director
 1884–1888: Alfred von Gramatzki (DKP), titled land director
 1888–1896: Klemens von Stockhausen, titled land director
 1896–1909: Rudolf von Brandt, titled land captain 
 1909–1916: Friedrich von Berg, titled land captain 
 1916–1928: Manfred Graf von Brünneck-Bellschwitz, titled land captain 
 1928–1936: Paul Blunk, titled land captain 
 1936–1941: Helmuth von Wedelstädt (NSDAP), titled land captain 
 1941–1945: vacancy
 1941–1945: Reinhard Bezzenberger, first land councillor, per pro

Cities and towns

See also 
 Drang nach Osten
 Landsmannschaft Ostpreußen
 East Prussian Regional Museum
 Ostsiedlung

Explanatory notes

Citations

General bibliography 
 Publications in English

 Baedeker, Karl, Northern Germany, 14th revised edition, London, 1904.
  (on the years 1944/45)
 Alfred-Maurice de Zayas, " Nemesis at Potsdam". London, 1977. .
Alfred-Maurice de Zayas, A Terrible Revenge: The Ethnic Cleansing of the East European Germans, 1944-1950, 1994, 
 Carsten, F. L. "East Prussia". History 33#119 (1948), pp. 241–246. . Historiography of medieval and early modern period.
 Dickie, Reverend J.F., with E.Compton, Germany, A & C Black, London, 1912.
 Douglas, R.M.: Orderly and Humane. The Expulsion of the Germans after the Second World War. Yale University Press, 2012. .
 von Treitschke, Heinrich, History of Germany - vol.1: The Wars of Emancipation, (translated by E & C Paul), Allen & Unwin, London, 1915.
 Powell, E. Alexander, Embattled Borders, London, 1928.
 Prausser, Steffen and Rees, Arfon: The Expulsion of the "German" Communities from Eastern Europe at the End of the Second World War. Florence, Italy, European University Institute, 2004.
 Naimark, Norman: Fires of Hatred. Ethnic Cleansing in Twentieth-Century Europe. Cambridge, Harvard University Press, 2001.
 Steed, Henry Wickham, Vital Peace - A Study of Risks, Constable & Co., London, 1936.
 Newman, Bernard, Danger Spots of Europe, London, 1938.
  Wieck, Michael: A Childhood Under Hitler and Stalin: Memoirs of a "Certified Jew", University of Wisconsin Press, 2003, .
 Woodward, E.L., Butler, Rohan; Medlicott, W.N., Dakin, Douglas, & Lambert, M.E., et al. (editors), Documents on British Foreign Policy 1919-1939, Three Series, Her Majesty's Stationery Office (HMSO), London, numerous volumes published over 25 years. Cover the Versailles Treaty including all secret meetings; plebiscites and all other problems in Europe; includes all diplomatic correspondence from all states.
 Previté-Orton, C.W., Professor, The Shorter Cambridge Medieval History, Cambridge University Press, 1952 (2 volumes).
 Balfour, Michael, and John Mair, Four-Power Control in Germany and Austria 1945-1946, Oxford University Press, 1956.
 Kopelev, Lev, To Be Preserved Forever, ("Хранить вечно"), 1976.
 Koch, H.W., Professor, A History of Prussia, Longman, London, 1978/1984, (P/B), 
 Koch, H.W., Professor, A Constitutional History of Germany in the 19th and 20th Centuries, Longman, London, 1984, (P/B), 
 MacDonogh, Giles, Prussia, Sinclair-Stevenson, London, 1994, 
 Nitsch, Gunter, Weeds Like Us, AuthorHouse, 2006, 
 
 

 Publications in German

 B. Schumacher: Geschichte Ost- und Westpreussens, Würzburg 1959
 Boockmann, Hartmut: Ostpreußen und Westpreußen (= Deutsche Geschichte im Osten Europas). Siedler, Berlin 1992, 
 Buxa, Werner and Hans-Ulrich Stamm: Bilder aus Ostpreußen
 Dönhoff, Marion Gräfin v. :Namen die keiner mehr nennt - Ostpreußen, Menschen und Geschichte
 Dönhoff, Marion Gräfin v.: Kindheit in Ostpreussen
 Falk, Lucy:  Ich Blieb in Königsberg. Tagebuchblätter aus dunklen Nachkriegsjahren
 Kibelka, Ruth:  Ostpreußens Schicksaljahre, 1945-1948
 
 Nitsch, Gunter: "Eine lange Flucht aus Ostpreußen", Ellert & Richter Verlag, 2011, 
  Wieck, Michael: Zeugnis vom Untergang Königsbergs: Ein "Geltungsjude" berichtet, Heidelberger Verlaganstalt, 1990, 1993, .

 Publications in French

 Pierre Benoît, Axelle
 Georges Blond, L'Agonie de l'Allemagne
 Michel Tournier, Le Roi des aulnes

 Publications in Polish

External links 
Pictures of East Prussia Large archive 
Brandenburg Prince-Electors co-inheritors 1568, co-regent 1577
East Prussia FAQ
Extensive East & West Prussian Historical Materials  
East and West Prussia Gazetteer
Provinz Ostpreußen 
Ostpreußen.net 
Ostpreußen Info – East Prussia Information 
East- and West Prussia in Photos
Spuren der Vergangenheit / Следы Пρошлого (Traces of the past) This site by W.A. Milowskij, a Kaliningrad resident, contains hundreds of interesting photos, often with text explanations, of architectural and infrastructural artifacts of the territory's long German past 
German Empire: Province of East Prussia 
 
Britannica 2007 article
Growing up in East Prussia An oral history project, documenting the German history of East Prussia with memories and reports by contemporary witnesses 
East & West Prussia Map Collection
 Historical borders of East Prussia 

 
Provinces of Prussia
1773 establishments in Prussia
Former exclaves
Kingdom of Prussia
Regions of Europe
Historical regions
Partition (politics)
1945 disestablishments in Germany
Former eastern territories of Germany